David Tartakover (דוד טרטקובר) (born  1944) is an Israeli graphic designer, political activist, artist and design educator.

Biography
David Tartakover was born in Haifa in 1944. His father, Dr. Jacob Tartakover, was a lawyer. His mother, Alexandra Shulamit Tarkatover (originally Gluckstein), was a teacher and the sister of Tony Cliff. When he was four, the family moved to Jerusalem, where he attended high school. Between 1962 and 1964, he served in the Israel Defense Forces in the Paratroopers Brigade. He later fought as a reservist in the Yom Kippur War in 1973. Tartakover studied at the Bezalel Academy of Arts and Design, and is a graduate of the London College of Printing.

Artistic career
Since 1975, Tartakover has operated his own studio in Tel Aviv, specializing in various aspects of visual communications, with particular emphasis on culture and politics.

From 1976, Tatakover has been a senior lecturer in the Visual Communication Department of the Bezalel Academy, is a member of Alliance Graphique Internationale (AGI), has been a president of the Graphic Designers Association of Israel (GDAI).

He has established a reputation for a series of politically provocative self-produced posters, some at the time of Rosh Hashanah (the Jewish new year). His compositions are driven more by content or themes than by high aesthetics. He has described his work as a "seismograph" and "a way of reacting to events... to alter opinions and attitudes".

Tartakover designed Peace Now's logo in 1978. The logo emerged from a poster created by Tartakover for a mass rally, held in what is now Rabin Square in Tel Aviv on April 1, 1978, titled "Peace Now." It became the name of the organization, the first political bumper sticker in Israel and it is still one of Israel's most popular stickers. Tartakover, commenting in 2006, said "The movement activists liked the logo, [b]ut they thought there should also be a symbol. I told them it wasn't needed - this is the symbol. It took time until they understood that this was the first political sticker in Israel." The logo combines two typefaces, "Shalom" (peace) in black traditional Koren Bible Type (designed by Eliyahu Koren) and "Achshav" (now) in the red headline-style Haim Type (designed by Jan Le Witt).

He describes himself as "a local designer," meaning that the subjects he tackles concern Israel. He follows the mantra of Hebrew expressionist poet Avigdor Hameiri (b. Andor Feuerstein): "Freedom of opinion is not a right but a duty". Influences on Tartakover's work stem from Gustav Klutsis, John Heartfield, Alexander Rodchenko, Ben Shahn, and Andy Warhol. He claims that his mentor has been comic-book artist Bob Gill and that best work is the Hebrew-lettered "Peace Now" logo. Tatakover is one of the most prominent Israeli graphic designers; others include Franz Kraus (1905–1998), Gabriel and Maxim Shamir (1909–1992, 1910–1990), and Dan Reisinger (1934–2019).

One-Person Exhibitions
Tokyo Designers Space Open Gallery (1982); "Produce of Israel" (1984), Israel Museum, Jerusalem; "Produce of Israel" (1985), Tel Aviv Museum of Art; "Proclamation of the Independence" (1988), Israel Museum, Jerusalem; Espace Floréal, Paris, France (1994); Festival d'affiches, Chaumont, France (1995); Plakatmuseum am Niederrhein, Germany (1997); Passage de Retz, Paris, France (1998); DDD Gallery, Osaka, Japan (1998); Arc en Rêve, Centre d'architecture, Bordeaux, France (1998), Les Rencontres d'Arles festival, France, 2005.

Awards and recognition
In 2002, Tartakover was awarded the Israel Prize, for design. The judges said, "His unique work creates a synthesis between popular and high culture, between the written text and visual imagery, and between personal statements and collective representations of local cultural values. As a creator, teacher, and an active member of the community for over thirty years, he has influenced the language of visual representation in Israel."
 
His work has won numerous awards and prizes and is included in the collections of museums in Europe, U.S. and Japan.

Prizes include the Gold medal, 8th Poster Biennale (1989), Lahti, Finland; second prize at the Salon of Photography (1990), Kalish, Poland; honourable mention, Helsinki International Poster Biennale (1997); bronze medal, 17th International Poster Biennale (2000), Warsaw; second prize, 13th International Poster Biennale (2001), Lahti, Finland
 Sandberg Prize recipient

See also
Visual arts in Israel
List of Israel Prize recipients

References

Further reading
 Goldstaub-Dainotto, Edna (1997), "David Tartakover: the imagery of hope." Graphis magazine (vol. 53, pp. 50–57)
 Weill, Alain: Encyclopédie de l'affiche. Éditions Hazan, Paris 2011, p. 380.

External links

David Tartakover - The Palestine Poster Project Archives
David Tartakover:Freehand Design / Motto of My Work - Posters of Discontent exhibit
I Am Here - The Israeli Center for Digital Art
I Am Here - International Triennale of Political Posters, Mons, Belgium, 2004

Israeli artists
Israeli graphic designers
Israel Prize in design recipients
Sandberg Prize recipients
Art educators
Israeli poster artists
Israeli activists
1944 births
Living people
Bezalel Academy of Arts and Design alumni
Design educators